RBHS may refer to:
 Australia
 Randwick Boys High School in Randwick, New South Wales
 Canada
 Robert Bateman High School in Burlington, Ontario
 South Africa
 Rondebosch Boys' High School in Rondebosch, Cape Town, Western Cape
 United Kingdom
 Rivington and Blackrod High School in Bolton, England
 United States
 Rainier Beach High School in Seattle, Washington
 Rancho Bernardo High School in San Diego, California
 Red Bank High School in Red Bank, Tennessee
 Red Bay High School in Red Bay, Alabama
 Red Bluff High School in Red Bluff, California
 River Bluff High School in Lexington, South Carolina
 Riverside Brookfield High School in Riverside, Illinois
 Roanoke-Benson High School in Roanoke, Illinois
 Rock Bridge High School in Columbia, Missouri
 Roger Bacon High School in St. Bernard, Ohio
 Ross Beatty Junior/Senior High School in Cassopolis, Michigan
 Rutgers Biomedical and Health Sciences in Newark, New Brunswick, Piscataway, and Camden, New Jersey